The Shaw Centre for the Salish Sea (formerly Shaw Ocean Discovery Centre) is a not-for-profit aquarium and cultural learning centre that focuses on the ecosystem of the Salish Sea and is located in the Sidney Pier Building on the waterfront in the Vancouver Island town of Sidney, Canada, in the Greater Victoria region. Since its grand opening on June 20, 2009, the Shaw Centre for the Salish Sea has become a highly regarded environmental education centre, as well as a popular attraction frequented by tourists and locals alike. The centre has won numerous awards including being named "One of Canada's Top Ten New Attractions" for summer 2009 by Where magazine.

History
The development of the Shaw Centre for the Salish Sea started in 2004, when the Town of Sidney approved the development proposal by the Marker Group to build the Sidney Pier Hotel and condominium project on a waterfront site overlooking the Salish Sea.  The construction of the Sidney Pier Building was approved by the town on the basis that the project would feature and fund a series of community amenities that included providing  of space on the ground floor of the development that would be given to the town at no cost. Owned by the town, the space was originally intended to house the previously existing Marine Mammal Museum and Marine Ecology Centre. Board members from the two not-for-profit organizations recognized the opportunity the expanded space could offer and agreed to work together to create a marine attraction and education centre. The two groups established the non-profit New Marine Centre Society on February 14, 2005.

The founding volunteer board, chaired by Owen Redfern, included Terry Curran, Markus Grieser, Dr. John Harper, Dr. Rick Hudson, Cliff McNeil-Smith, Rhonda Reidy, Clive Tanner and Barbara Taylor. Town of Sidney councilor Peter Wainwright served as liaison to Town Council. In 2005, the board was supplemented with the addition of Peter Lloyd FCA, David Bartley, Richard Flader CA, Alastair Tough CMA, and noted ocean scientist Dr. Verena Tunnicliffe.  During 2005, with the support of Sidney Mayor Don Amos, Sidney council and town staff, a lease agreement was negotiated whereby the New Marine Centre Society would essentially have free use of the town owned space for a period of twenty years (2009 to 2029) with an option for a further 10 year renewal. The society would be responsible for securing all capital and operational funding for what was then referred to as a marine museum.

Throughout 2005, the board prepared an economic feasibility study and business plan, conducted a survey of other facilities, considered potential design consultants, engaged in community consultations and developed a vision statement. In November 2005 the board hired Angus Matthews on a two-month contract to assess the information and community feedback the board had acquired. Matthews was asked to provide concept for the new facility. At this point, there was considerable urgency as Marker Group had the building well under construction and on target for a May 2006 opening. Matthews became a catalyst for action and presented the board with a bold proposal for a $5 million aquarium of the Salish Sea. With the support of the board, he presented the concept at a community meeting held at the Mary Winspear Centre in Sidney on December 14, 2005. Andre and Associates of Victoria assisted Matthews in producing the first conceptual drawings and experiential story-line for what soon became the final concept. The project now had considerable momentum. After conducting a search, the board appointed Angus Matthews as the first executive director of the society. Matthews' mandate was to finalize the concept, produce plans and budgets for both construction and operations, direct and participate in the fundraising campaign, oversee construction of the facility,  develop a branding, marketing and communications program, and have a fully operational aquarium staffed, stocked and ready to open in 31 months by June 20, 2009.

Early in 2006, founding board member and fundraising chair, Clive Tanner invited community leaders and philanthropists, Murray and Lynda Farmer to dinner at the Deep Cove Chalet restaurant. The Farmers had attended the original presentation and were already very enthusiastic about the project. The Farmers were very committed to the community on the Saanich Peninsula having been deeply involved previously in the establishment of the Mary Winspear Centre. Over dinner, Tanner and Matthews asked if both Murray and Lynda Farmer would agree to co-chair a volunteer campaign cabinet to launch the $5 million Discover Your Ocean Campaign. With the Farmer's leadership, support of the campaign cabinet, advice and effort of Clive Tanner and Angus Matthews the campaign was launched in September 2006 and completed on April 20, 2009. Major donations to the fundraising campaign included a $2.5 million gift from the Shaw Charitable Committee, a $2 million grant from Canada/BC Rural Municipal Infrastructure Fund, and $1.5 million in private donations from individuals and companies in the Sidney area to reach the $5 million goal. When the very significant contribution of the $3.5 million value of the space contributed to the community by Marker Group is factored in, the entire project has a value of $8.5 million. Without the support of Grant Rogers and the Marker Group, Shaw Communications Inc. and the Shaw family, and the taxpayers of Canada the project would not have been possible.

As fundraising proceeded, members of the board took on significant roles to guide the project and support Matthews in fulfilling his mandate. Owen Redfern applied his extensive construction and project management experience to oversee construction. Dr. John Harper, Dr. Verena Tunnicliffe and Rhonda Reidy worked with on the exhibits, messaging and visitor experience. Barbara Taylor assisted with HR procedures, volunteer recruitment and training. Dr. Rick Hudson, Peter Lloyd, Richard Flader, Cliff McNeil-Smith and Alistair Tough worked with Matthews to develop the business plan and financial systems. Very much a working board, everyone pitched in doing everything from helping park cars or unload boats at special events to decisively making the major strategic and financial decisions as the funding became available.

The project also received advice from a number of scientific/educational experts including Dr. Bill Austin, Sue Staniforth and Dr. John Nightingale and his staff at the Vancouver Aquarium. Matthews also worked closely Coast Salish elders including Tom Sampson, the late Earle Claxton, the late Ray Sam and John Elliott. The elders provided extensive advice regarding the Salish Sea and the First People's interactions and special relationships with the ocean and marine life through the generations.

Final design, based on Matthews' initial concept, was developed by Seattle based aquarium designer James Peterson. The design was very complex because the aquarium was being inserted into a 10,000 square foot space on three levels on the ground floor of the new Sidney Pier Building. All of the massive concrete walls in the space were key structural components of the six story building with underground parking below. The design of the aquarium's mechanical and public spaces was required to fit the structure, as built, without modification. The floor structure required considerable reinforcement to support 87 tonnes of seawater aquariums being added to the building.

Interior construction began on August 21, 2008. Because of the complexity of the mechanical systems and the design, Matthews recommended that the New Marine Centre Society serve as the general contractor. Since fundraising had advanced sufficiently, the board authorized Matthews to proceed flat out with construction. Former board dhair, Owen Redfern volunteered as project manager and Mike Lewis was retained as construction superintendent. With the support and effort of remarkable trades people, artists and sub-contractors the centre opened on time and slightly under budget after just 10 months of construction. Coast Salish artist Charles Elliott was commissioned to produce a series of graphics that are reproduced throughout the centre, used in marketing materials and in the striking fish sculpture located outside the main entrance that was designed by James Peterson. Local glass artist Rick Silas produced the kelp panels featured in the lobby and bronze artist Paul Harder was commissioned to create the sea creatures featured in the outdoor tide pool in the waterfront park on the east side of the building. The freely assessable, outdoor tide pool feature associated with the aquarium, was a gift to the people of Sidney from the Gwyn Morgan & Patricia Trottier Family Foundation. Included in the frantic construction schedule was sufficient time to test run the aquarium life-support systems as well as collect and introduce the animal collection to their habitats in preparation for opening.

Prior to the June 20, 2009, opening date, Matthews assembled the small professional staff that would operate the aquarium with the support of over 170 volunteers who are referred to as Oceaneers. Ranging in age from 8 to the top end of the age scale, the Oceaneers became the personality of the centre and essential to its operation and financial model. They participated in hours of training in preparation for the opening. The core Oceaneers came from the former Marine Mammal Museum or the Marine Ecology Centre, both of which had closed before the centre opened. The centre's community coordinator, Beth Watkins and assistant aquarist Paula Romagosa each came from these organizations. The rest of the founding staff included: Angus Matthews - executive director,  Linda Funk - education and visitor experience director, Mike Anderson - head aquarist, Eric Manchester - operations manager, Joan Eaglesham - fundraising and community relations director, Robin Waterman - marketing manager, Mike Lewis - systems manager and Kendra Fowler - community coordinator (PT) .

The Shaw name was permanently attached to the Shaw Centre for the Salish Sea prior to opening in recognition of the largest single gift to the project, $2.5 million from Shaw Communications. Board member Dale Ryan was key in working with Matthews to develop the branding and marketing/public relations strategies for the centre. It was positioned as a self-supporting, entrepreneurial not-for-profit, environmental education centre focused on the wonders of the Salish Sea at the aquarium's doorstep. Holy Cow Communications, working with Matthews, served as the centre's agency and developed the brand ideation, associated signage, advertising and all marketing materials in preparation for opening.

On Saturday June 20, 2009, the Shaw Centre for the Salish Sea opened to the public after a ceremony led by Coast Salish elder Tom Sampson. Featured guests included, MP Gary Lunn, MLA Murray Coell, recently retired Mayor Don Amos, Mayor Larry Cross, Lynda and Murray Farmer, Board Chair Peter Lloyd, Chief Vern Jacks, Audrey Sampson and special guests Céline Cousteau and Phoenix Underwood. During the outdoor ceremony in front of the centre beside the ocean, Coast Salish dancers and singers presented welcome and honour songs. The performers then led a large procession of invited guests, supporters and interested local residents around the building with a traditional paddle song. The song is still used in the aquarium today with the permission of the Sampson family. After the ceremonial cutting of the kelp "ribbon" the first two visitors to enter the centre were two children, Phoenix Underwood and April Funk accompanied by Céline Cousteau. Once the darkened aquarium was full to capacity with invited guests, Phoenix, April and Céline Cousteau began to pour water from a large jug into a carved wooden bowl under a shaft of light while the Coast Salish members present blessed and dedicated the aquarium to understanding between peoples and shared respect for the ocean. As the water poured the lighting in the aquarium habitats was increased to reveal the wonders of the Salish Sea surrounding the assembly.

At noon the Shaw Centre for the Salish Sea opened to the public. Over 1,600 people visited the aquarium on the first weekend.

Exhibits
Gallery of Drifters

This exhibit shows many species of jelly fish, plankton, and algae  to help visitors understand the foundations of the ocean food web in the Salish Sea. Species in this exhibit include sea nettles and moon jellies.

Ocean's Heartbeat

This wet lab and classroom is used by school groups, though ordinary visitors are welcome when it is not in use. It contains microscopes for visitors to view the mini-ecosystems habitats, and a teacher's desk with a fish tank inside. The area is also used to house new-born fish and contain bones of whales. Lastly, the exhibit contains a 60-cm female fetus of a hybrid harbour and Dall's porpoise that was discovered from a dead female Dall's porpoise on Southern Vancouver Island in 1998.

Gallery of the Salish Sea

The Centre is home to up to 3000 creatures at one time, with around 150 species of plant life, marine invertebrates, and fish. Most of these species are housed in the main Gallery of the Salish Sea, notably including wolf eels, and a giant Pacific octopus. Kept only for half a year, a single octopus inhabits the centre at a time, before they are released back into the waters they were caught from to complete their lifecycle and breed. During their time at the Centre, the octopuses increase in size dramatically, and show distinct personalities that can be attributed to their high cephalopod intelligence. 

Touch pools
Using only one finger, visitors can gently touch some of the Salish Sea’s many invertebrates, including sea urchins, sea cucumbers, and sea stars, under the supervision of the Centre’s Oceaneers. The touch pool also provides a stunning view of the Southern Gulf Islands against the backdrop of Mount Baker, an active volcano.

Seaweed Gallery
The back gallery of the Centre is occupied by Seaweed: Mysteries of the Amber Forests, the Centre's first fully in-house curated exhibit, and features the work of Josie Iselin and Sarah Jim among other artists. The exhibit opended on the 15th of October, 2022, and showcases the often-ignored yet vital plant life of the ocean.

References

External links

Zoos in British Columbia
Aquaria in Canada